Eclipta astrigae is a species of beetle in the family Cerambycidae. It was described by Penaherrera-Leiva and Tavakilian in 2003.

References

Eclipta (beetle)
Beetles described in 2003